Samoa Air was a small airline from Samoa that operated scheduled flights between the domestic islands as well as to American Samoa. It also provided charter flights and medical transfer flights. The airline appears to have become dormant in 2015; its website is blank and its Facebook page is no longer updated.

Incidents
On 21 June 2012, a Samoa Air aircraft almost collided with a Polynesian Airlines aircraft near Fagali'i. Both aircraft were on the same flight path. Civil Aviation issued a stern warning to Samoa Air for failing to follow standard operating procedures. Samoa Air's CEO, Chris Langton, disputed the outcome of the investigation.

Pay by weight

Samoa Air gained global press coverage by becoming the first airline in the world to charge customers by body weight plus luggage.

The fare is calculated by multiplying a base fare (depending on the route flown) by the total weight of the passenger plus their luggage. So a passenger flying from Apia to Asau weighing  and carrying  of luggage would pay US$132 for the flight (100 kg x US$1.32 base fare), while another passenger weighing  and traveling without luggage would pay US$79.20 (60 kg x US$1.32 base fare) for the same flight. Children are charged in the same way at a 75% rate.

Fleet

References

External links
 Samoa Air

Airlines of Samoa
Defunct airlines of Oceania
Airlines established in 2012
2012 establishments in Samoa
Airlines disestablished in 2015
2015 disestablishments in Oceania